Stefan Stoykov can refer to:

 Stefan Stoykov (basketball) (1938–2013), Bulgarian basketball player
 Stefan Stoykov (javelin thrower), born 1951, Bulgarian athlete
 Stefan Stoykov (rowing), born 1953, Bulgarian rowing coxswain